Nick Dennis (April 26, 1904 – November 14, 1980) was a Greek American film actor born in Thessaly, Greece.

Biography
The supporting actor, who began in films in 1947, was known for playing ethnic types (usually Greek) in films such as Kiss Me Deadly and the Humphrey Bogart film Sirocco. Dennis, who spoke Greek fluently, appeared in a number of television programs in the 1950s, 1960s, and 1970s including playing the parts of Orderly Nick Kanavaras on the medical drama Ben Casey and Uncle Constantine on the detective show Kojak.

Nick Dennis also played the role of Pablo Gonzales in Tennessee Williams' play, A Streetcar Named Desire, as well as its subsequent film version in 1951.

Filmography

References

External links
 
 

1904 births
1980 deaths
People from Thessaly
Greek emigrants to the United States